The Alliance of Women Film Journalists Award for Best Actor is an annual Best Actor award given by the Alliance of Women Film Journalists. The award is often referred to as an EDA as a tribute to AWFJ founder Jennifer Merin's mother, actress Eda Reiss Merin. EDA is also an acronym for Excellent Dynamic Activism.

2000s

2010s

References

Alliance of Women Film Journalists
American film awards
Film awards for lead actor